Crexell is a surname of Argentinian origin.

People with the surname 

 Carmen Lucila Crexell (born 1972), Argentinian politician
 Rodrigo Crexell (born 1968), Argentinian rugby player

See also 

 Creixell

Surnames
Surnames of Spanish origin